Monique Leroux (17 August 1938 – 11 February 1985) was a French fencer. She competed in the women's individual and team foil events at the 1960 Summer Olympics. She was born in Paris.

References

External links
 

1938 births
1985 deaths
Fencers from Paris
French female foil fencers
Olympic fencers of France
Fencers at the 1960 Summer Olympics
20th-century French women